FabricLive.70 is a DJ mix album by English drum and bass musician DJ Friction. The album was released as part of the FabricLive Mix Series.

Track listing

References

External links
FabricLive.70 at Fabric

Fabric (club) albums
2013 compilation albums